The Ambassador of Peru to Ghana is the official representative of the Republic of Peru to the Republic of Ghana.

Both countries established diplomatic relations on June 23, 1987. Peru has an embassy in Accra since 2014, which it shares with other members of the Pacific Alliance.

The embassy is one of two embassies of Peru in Sub-Saharan Africa, the other being in Pretoria, South Africa, since the closure of three embassies in Kenya and Southern Africa in 1990.

List of representatives

See also
List of ambassadors of Peru to South Africa

References

Ghana
Peru